Thraves is a surname. Notable people with the surname include:

Alfred John Thraves (1888–1953), English architect
Jamie Thraves (born 1969), British film writer and director
James Thraves (1869–1936), English footballer
Stephen Thraves, British children's writer